Oboddara (Russian and Tajik: Ободдара, formerly Uyas) is a village in Sughd Region, northern Tajikistan. It is part of the jamoat Zarhalol in the city of Istaravshan.

Notes

References

Populated places in Sughd Region